Clive Leyman (born 1935) is a Welsh aerodynamicist, and was the chief aerodynamicist of Concorde.

Early life
He went to Neath Grammar School for Boys in Wales. He studied at Queen Mary College in London.

Career

BAC
He joined the Bristol Aeroplane Company in 1957, which became BAC in 1960. He became the Chief Aerodynamicist at BAC. He worked with Jean Rech of Aérospatiale. Aerodynamic research for Concorde was notably carried out with the BAC 221, which had a droop nose, and the Dassault Mirage IV. Concorde had an ogee-shaped wing.

British Aerospace
With British Aerospace, he became the Chief Engineer of the HOTOL project.

He later became a part-time Professor in Mechanical Engineering and Aeronautics at City, University of London.

Personal life
He lives in Pucklechurch, a village on the B4465 in South Gloucestershire, close to the M4. He married in 1957. He married Daphne Phipps in 1985.

Publications
 Concorde aerodynamics and associated systems development, American Institute of Aeronautics and Astronautics, 1980 (with Jean Rech) 
 A Review of the Technical Development of Concorde, Progress in Aerospace Sciences Volume 23 1986

See also
 Ray Creasey, chief aerodynamicist of the English Electric Lightning
 Don Dykins, chief aerodynamicist for British Aerospace Civil Division
 Aerospace industry in the United Kingdom

References

External links
 BAC 100

1935 births
Academics of City, University of London
Aerodynamicists
Alumni of Queen Mary University of London
Bristol Aeroplane Company
British Aircraft Corporation
Concorde
People educated at Neath Grammar School for Boys
People from Neath
Welsh aerospace engineers
Living people